James Edward Humphreys (December 10, 1939 – August 27, 2020) was an American mathematician, who worked in algebraic groups, Lie groups, and Lie algebras and applications of these mathematical structures. He is known as the author of several mathematical texts, such as Introduction to Lie Algebras and Representation Theory and Reflection Groups and Coxeter Groups.

Humphreys died weeks after contracting COVID-19 during the COVID-19 pandemic in Massachusetts.

Education
Humphreys attended elementary and secondary school in Erie, Pennsylvania and then studied at Oberlin College (bachelor's degree 1961) and from 1961 philosophy and mathematics at Cornell University. At Yale University he earned his master's degree in 1964 and his PhD in 1966 under George Seligman with thesis Algebraic Lie Algebras over fields of prime characteristic.

Career
In 1966, he became an assistant professor at the University of Oregon and in 1970 an associate professor at New York University. At the University of Massachusetts Amherst he became in 1974 an associate professor and in 1976 a full professor; he retired there in 2003 as professor emeritus. In 1968/69 and in 1977, he was a visiting scholar at the Institute for Advanced Study and in 1969/70 at the Courant Institute of Mathematical Sciences of New York University. In 1985 he was a visiting professor at Rutgers University.

Works
Arithmetic Groups, Lecture Notes in Mathematics 789, Springer Verlag 1980 (from lectures at the Courant Institute 1971)
Conjugacy classes in semisimple algebraic groups, AMS 1995
Introduction to Lie Algebras and Representation Theory, Springer Verlag, Graduate Texts in Mathematics, 1972, 7th edition 1997 (also translated into Chinese and Russian)
Linear Algebraic Groups, Graduate Texts in Mathematics, Springer Verlag 1974, 1998 (also translated into Russian). 
Ordinary and modular representations of Chevalley groups, Springer Verlag 1976. 
Modular representations of finite groups of Lie type, London Mathematical Society Lecture Note Series 326, Cambridge University Press 2006
Reflection Groups and Coxeter Groups, Cambridge University Press 1990. 
Representations of semisimple Lie algebras in the BGG category , AMS 2008
Modular representations of simple Lie algebras, Bull. Amer. Math. Soc. (N.S.), Vol. 35, 1998, pp. 105–122. 
Modular representations of classical Lie algebras, Bull. Amer. Math. Soc., Vol. 76, 1970, 878–882 
Algebraic groups and modular Lie algebras, Memoirs AMS 71, 1967
Hilbert's fourteenth problem, American Mathematical Monthly, Vol. 85, 1978, 341–353
Math. Monthly, Vol. 82, 1975, 21–39
Highest weight modules for semisimple Lie algebras, in: Representation Theory I, Lecture Notes in Mathematics 831, Springer Verlag 1980, pp, 72–103

Awards

References

External links
Homepage

1939 births
20th-century American mathematicians
21st-century American mathematicians
Oberlin College alumni
Yale University alumni
University of Massachusetts Amherst faculty
People from Erie, Pennsylvania
Institute for Advanced Study visiting scholars
2020 deaths
Cornell University alumni
LGBT people from Massachusetts
Deaths from the COVID-19 pandemic in Massachusetts
Mathematicians from Pennsylvania